Juan del Vado y Gomez (1625–1691) was a Spanish composer, organist and violinist. He is noted for the enigmatic canons, symbolic musical puzzles, dedicated to his king Charles II of Spain.

He came from a family of violinists.

Works, editions and recordings
 Keyboard works - including four keyboard pieces preserved in P.Pm Ms 1577 Loe.
 Enigmatic canons
 tonos humanos in the Guerra Manuscript and other sources.

References

1625 births
1691 deaths
17th-century classical composers
Spanish composers
Spanish male composers
17th-century male musicians